Anindita Nayar born 1 July 1988, is an Indian actress. And she made her debut in Amit Sahni Ki List as the lead opposite Vir Das in 2014.

Early life and career
Anindita collected her first ad commercial for Idea with the "No Idea - Get Idea" opposite Abhishek Bachchan. She also did commercials for Panasonic opposite Ranbir Kapoor and Garnier Color Naturals opposite Karisma Kapoor. She is in films like 3 AM by Vishal Mahadkar and Essel Vision Productions and will also be featured in Hasmukh Pighal Gaya, the lead opposite Vidya Balan, Amitabh Bachchan. She is also acting in P.O.W. - Bandi Yuddh Ke, directed by Nikkhil Advani, and is an official adaptation of the Israeli drama Hatufim (Homeland).

Films

References

External links 

 

Indian film actresses
Actresses in Hindi cinema
Female models from Delhi
1988 births
Living people
Actresses from New Delhi
21st-century Indian actresses